Mina Assadi (born March 12, 1943) is an Iranian-born poet, author, journalist and songwriter who lives in exile in Stockholm, Sweden.

Author
She is known for writing about controversial and provocative subjects, especially when she describes the fight against the Iranian government. In 2007 she wrote the poem called "Pimps" (Djakesha). It caused a lot of discussion for being too vulgar. The poem is about those who live in Iran and in exile who have forgotten the struggle. She wrote her debut book, a collection of poems named "Minas Gift" (Armanghane Mina), at the age of 18. Thereafter she worked as a journalist for several well-known Iranian magazines, for example, Kayhan. She has written 14 books in total, the book "Who throws rocks" (Che kasi sang miandazad) attracting the most attention.

Songwriter
Assadi has also written songs for Iranian singers like Ebi ("Halah"), Dariush ("Zendegi jek basie" and "Ahay javoon"), Hayedeh ("Onkeh jek rosi barajeh man khoda bod"), Giti ("Oje parvaz"), Ramesh ("To aftabi, to baroni") and Nooshafarin ("Koh he ghavei") and Afshin ("delam az ru nemire) to name a few.

"Mina Assadi - the Forough Farrokhzad of today"
Ten days before the great Iranian cultural personality and singer Fereydoun Farrokhzad was brutally murdered in Germany on August 7, 1992, he had a poetry evening. This evening interspersed with poems, songs and political statements. There, Fereydoun compared his late sister, the greatest  contemporary poet of Iran, Forough Farrokhzad, to Mina Assadi. A statement that was filmed and became the last video with Fereydoun before his death.

“In the time we live in, there are other Iranian poets like Forough as well… Simin Daneshvar, Simin Behbahani, Mina Assadi to name a few. In Stockholm, Sweden, where Mina Assadi is located I asked all the intellectuals in the hall, 500-600 Iranians, why they treat Mina Assadi badly? For Forough that is no longer alive you gather, but you pay little attention to Mina Assadi who is still alive… she is also a Forough… with white hair, without any makeup, she lives a painfully difficult life in exile… but no one pays attention to her and instead they down her. Have you ever heard that there was a memorial evening to honor Mina Assadi? Have you heard of one? Neither have I. She is a poet of the Persian language. One of the great female poets of our time.”

Mina Assadi has also been compared to other Persian poets like Simin Behbahani (who as well is a Hellman/Hammet Grant winner) and Parvin E'tesami and Swedish poets Karl Vennberg and Edith Södergran.

Awards
In the year of 1996, she won the Hellman/Hammett Grant from the Human Rights Watch of New York City, U.S.

Sources
 R M Chopra, "Eminent Poetesses of Persian", Iran Society, Kolkata, 2010.
 "Mina Assadi is the Forough Farrokhzad of today"

See also

 Parvin E'tesami
 Forough Farrokhzad
 Leila Kasra
 Fereydoun Farrokhzad
 Ebi
 Dariush (singer)
 Simin Behbahani
 List of Iranian women
 Persian literature

External links

hrw.org

1943 births
Living people
Persian-language women poets
Persian-language poets
People from Sari, Iran
Iranian emigrants to Sweden
Iranian songwriters
21st-century Iranian poets
21st-century Iranian short story writers
Iranian women poets
Iranian essayists
Iranian journalists
Iranian women journalists
Iranian women short story writers
Iranian women novelists
Iranian novelists
Iranian women essayists
21st-century essayists
20th-century Iranian women writers
20th-century Iranian writers
21st-century Iranian women writers
21st-century Iranian writers